The Woodbridge House is a historic house in Andover, Massachusetts.  It was built for George Woodbridge, a cordwainer, sometime between 1847 and 1852.  The financially troubled Woodbridge sold the property in 1853, and has been through a succession of owners since.  The house is notable for Greek Revival styling that is comparatively elaborate for a rural setting and a house of modest means.

The house was listed on the National Register of Historic Places (as "Woodridge House") in 1982.

See also
National Register of Historic Places listings in Andover, Massachusetts
National Register of Historic Places listings in Essex County, Massachusetts

References

Houses in Andover, Massachusetts
National Register of Historic Places in Andover, Massachusetts
Houses on the National Register of Historic Places in Essex County, Massachusetts